Archaeosynthemis spiniger is a species of dragonfly of the family Synthemistidae,
known as the spiny tigertail. 
It is a medium-sized dragonfly with black and yellow markings. 
It inhabits streams and rivers in south-western Australia.

Archaeosynthemis spiniger is also known as Synthemis spiniger.

Gallery

See also
 List of Odonata species of Australia

References

Synthemistidae
Odonata of Australia
Endemic fauna of Australia
Taxa named by Robert John Tillyard
Insects described in 1913